Sushila Hazarika is a Bharatiya Janata Party politician from Assam. She was elected in Assam Legislative Assembly election in 1996 and 2006 from Dergaon constituency.

References 

Living people
Asom Gana Parishad politicians
Bharatiya Janata Party politicians from Assam
Assam MLAs 1996–2001
Assam MLAs 2006–2011
People from Golaghat district
Year of birth missing (living people)